The Abel H. Fish House is a historic house at Buckley Hill Road and Rathbun Hill Road in Salem, Connecticut.  Built about 1835, it is a well-preserved example of a vernacular Greek Revival farmhouse.  It was listed on the National Register of Historic Places on March 2, 1982.

Description and history
The Abel H. Fish House is located in the rural setting of northeastern Salem, near the junction of Buckley Hill and Rathbun Hill Roads.  It is set well south of Buckley Hill Road, about  down a lane that used to be a public road, and is oriented facing south, away from the road.  It is a -story wood-frame structure, with a gabled roof, four-bay facade, and clapboarded exterior.  It has Greek Revival features, including an entry flanked by sidelight windows and pilasters, and topped by a transom window and entablature.  To the east is a single-story wing, believed to be an older structure.  The interior has a number of unusual features, including a winding staircase near the entrance, and a space that may have been used for the manufacture of soap.

The house was built about 1835, and is a typical example of a period farmhouse built for a farmer of middling economic means. Abel Fish bought this farm, then  in 1826, where he grew potatoes and raised dairy cows and sheep. He was active an area Baptist congregation, referred to in local records as "Deacon Abel Fish".

See also
National Register of Historic Places listings in New London County, Connecticut

References

Houses on the National Register of Historic Places in Connecticut
Houses completed in 1835
Salem, Connecticut
Houses in New London County, Connecticut
National Register of Historic Places in New London County, Connecticut